The Extraordinary and Plenipotentiary Ambassador of Peru to the State of Qatar is the official representative of the Republic of Peru to the State of Qatar.

Both countries established relations in 1989. The Peruvian embassy in Doha opened in 2011, and the Qatari embassy in Lima opened next year.

List of representatives

See also
List of ambassadors of Peru to Kuwait
List of ambassadors of Peru to Saudi Arabia
List of Consuls-General of Peru in Dubai

References

Qatar
Peru